Empires and Dance is the third studio album by Scottish new wave band Simple Minds, released on 12 September 1980 by record label Arista.

Background 
The album was influenced by the band's experience of travelling in Europe on their previous tour. Prior to the album the band demoed several of their new songs, including "Capital City" and "I Travel" that had appeared on that tour. "Room" was first recorded as a John Peel session in December 1979 together with three songs from Real to Real Cacophony. (These recordings were all later released as part of the 2004 box set Silver Box).

Recording and release 
Empires and Dance was recorded from May to July 1980 in Wales at Rockfield Studios and the Rolling Stones Mobile Studio. 

While more successful than its non-charting predecessor (Real to Real Cacophony), Empires and Dance charted relatively poorly, peaking at only number 41 in the UK Albums Chart. According to AllMusic, this was primarily because Arista Records only released a small number of copies at a time before each batch sold out. This had the effect of limited availability for fans.

The opening track "I Travel" was released as a single in 1980, but failed to chart. "Celebrate" was chosen as the second single due to popularity amongst fans. However, it was only released after Simple Minds had left Arista. As a result, the single sold very poorly, and the picture sleeve 7" is amongst the hardest of the band's singles to find.

Following the release of the album, Simple Minds transferred to Virgin Records, where they met with much greater commercial success. Arista tried to capitalise on this success by re-releasing "I Travel" as a single in 1982, along with the compilation Celebration. In 1983, Virgin re-released "I Travel" on 12", to coincide with the acquisition of the band's Arista catalogue. Both times, it still failed to chart.

Critical reception 

Empires and Dance has been well-received critically. Paul Morley called it "a weird, agitating record" in his review for NME. He highlighted "I Travel" as one of "the great disco-rock songs" and "the magnificent" "This Fear of Gods" as the band's "most impressive work to date", and concluded: "Simple Minds have invented their own ways, melodramatic yet modernist. An authentic new torch music. I'm dancing as fast as I can." Simon Ludgate of Record Mirror praised Empires and Dance as "one of the few classic albums of 1980."

Legacy 
In a retrospective review, Andy Kellman of AllMusic described Empires and Dance as a "post-punk dance classic". Trouser Press said that despite its inconsistency, Empires and Dance was an "extremely atmospheric and promising" album, "with good dance tunes and a few more quasi-psychedelic ones."

John Foxx has praised the album and Jim Kerr as a "unique" lyricist.

The album cover's faux Cyrillic typeface was emulated for the cover of Manic Street Preachers' third album The Holy Bible, released in 1994. (While the former album reversed all Rs and Ns to resemble Cyrillic letters, the latter album, in contrast, reversed only the Rs.) Twenty years later, Empires and Dance would be cited as a key influence on Futurology, the Manics' twelfth album. It remains one of singer and guitarist James Dean Bradfield's favourite records. He said of Empires and Dance in a 1995 Melody Maker article on his favourite albums:

Imagery in Patrik Sampler's novel The Ocean Container was inspired by "Thirty Frames a Second".

Track listing

Personnel 
Adapted from the album's liner notes.

Simple Minds
 Charlie Burchill – guitar, saxophone
 Derek Forbes – bass guitar, fretless bass guitar
 Jim Kerr – vocals
 Mick MacNeil – keyboards
 Brian McGee – drums
Technical
 John Leckie – production, engineering
 Hugh Jones – engineering
 The Artifex Studio – artwork
 Michael Ruetz – front cover photography
 Richard Coward – photography

Charts

References

External links 
 

1980 albums
Simple Minds albums
Albums produced by John Leckie
Albums recorded at Rockfield Studios
Arista Records albums